Schmiecha (in its lower course: Schmeie) is a river of Baden-Württemberg, Germany. It runs from the Raichberg through the town of Albstadt and through a valley of the Swabian Jura. It flows into the Danube near Inzigkofen.

See also
 List of rivers of Baden-Württemberg

References

Rivers of Baden-Württemberg
Rivers of Germany